Peter Chang may refer to:
Peter Chang (artist) (1944–2017), British jewelry artist
Peter Chang (chef), Chinese chef specializing in Szechwan cuisine
 Peter I. Chang (born 1973), Taiwanese-born mixed-media artist, illustrator, and filmmaker
 Zhang Xueliang (Chang Hsueh-liang, 1901–2001), ruler of Manchuria and participant in the Xi'an Incident (Sian Incident)